Matlock may refer to:

Places
Matlock, Derbyshire, a town in England
Matlock Bath, a village south of Matlock, Derbyshire, England
Matlock Bank, an area on a hill in Matlock, Derbyshire, England
Matlock Bridge, a bridge and surrounding area in Matlock, Derbyshire, England
Matlock, Iowa, a small city in the United States
Matlock, Manitoba, a community in Canada
Matlock, Victoria, a town in Australia
Matlock, Washington, a small town in the United States

People
Matlock (surname)

Other uses
Matlock (TV series), American television series
Ben Matlock, the title character of the TV series by the same name
Matlock Cable Tramway, cable tramway that served the town of Matlock between 1893 and 1927
Matlock Town F.C., a football club in Matlock, England
United States v. Matlock, a Supreme Court case
"Matlock", the tripcode of the persona behind QAnon